Raymond Luc "Ray" Levasseur (born October 10, 1946 in Sanford, Maine) is a former member of the United Freedom Front, a militant Marxist organization that conducted a series of bombings throughout the United States from 1976 to 1984.

Early life
In 1965, Levasseur enlisted in the United States Army, and was sent to Vietnam two years later, for a 12-month tour of duty. He felt that this experience radicalized him — claiming that he experienced racism, and began to feel strong opposition to fighting against the Vietnamese, whom he felt were struggling for their right to self-determination.

After returning from Vietnam, Levasseur moved to Tennessee, where he began attending college. There, he began working with the Southern Student Organizing Committee (SSOC).

In 1969, Levasseur was arrested for attempting to sell six dollars' worth of marijuana to an undercover police officer. Levasseur was given the maximum penalty of five years in prison. He was sent to the Tennessee State Penitentiary, where he spent two years in solitary confinement, before being released on parole.

He then moved back to Maine, where he began working with Vietnam Veterans Against the War (VVAW), and the Statewide Correctional Alliance for Reform (SCAR), a prisoners'-rights organization. It is while working with these activist groups in Maine, that Levasseur met his future wife, Pat Gros.

In 1975 Levasseur co-founded the Sam Melville/Jonathan Jackson Unit with Tom Manning, Pat Gros (Rowbottom) and Carol Manning which eventually became known as the United Freedom Front.  From 1975 to 1984 the UFF carried out several robberies as well as bombings targeted at corporations and institutions supporting the South African apartheid regime and US foreign policy in Central America.

Arrest and trial
On November 4, 1984, members of the Federal Bureau of Investigation's (FBI's) elite Hostage Rescue Team (HRT) arrested Levasseur, 38, and Gros, 30, after their van was halted in Deerfield, Ohio. According to the special agents, Levasseur kicked an agent but otherwise surrendered without a struggle. A 9-millimeter pistol was found in the van, and the couple's three children, who were in the van, were turned over to juvenile authorities, the Agents said.

Conviction and imprisonment
Levasseur and six of his comrades were eventually convicted of conspiracy in 1986 and sentenced to long terms. In 1987 Levasseur and all seven members of the UFF were charged with seditious conspiracy and violations of the RICO act.  The trial ended in an acquittal on most charges and a hung jury on the rest.

After the conspiracy charge in 1986, Levasseur was sentenced to 45 years in prison, and was sent immediately to Control Unit of the supermax prison, USP Marion. While there, he refused to work for the prison labor corporation UNICOR, producing weapons for the U.S. Department of Defense.

In 1994 he was transferred to ADX Florence in Colorado.

In 1999 he was transferred to the Atlanta Federal Prison, where he was released from solitary confinement for the first time in 13 years. Soon afterwards, he began to publish writings on the website Letters from Exile.

Levasseur was released from prison on parole in November 2004 having served nearly half of his 45-year sentence.

See also
 COINTELPRO
 George Jackson Brigade

Filmography
 (2015) Un américain, portrait de Raymond Luc Levasseur, directed by Pierre Marier, French-language feature-length documentary (99 minutes).

References

1946 births
Living people
American Marxists
People from Sanford, Maine
American prisoners and detainees
United States Army personnel of the Vietnam War
United States Army soldiers
Inmates of ADX Florence
People convicted of racketeering